"I'll Let You Slide" is a song by American recording artist Luther Vandross. The song is from his third studio album Busy Body. Released in 1983, the single reached No. 9 on the Billboard Hot R&B Singles chart.

Track listing
A "I'll Let You Slide" (Vocal) – 5:18
B "I'll Let You Slide" (Instrumental) – 5:18

Charts

References

External links
www.luthervandross.com
- Allmusic - Busy Body (Album)

1983 songs
Luther Vandross songs
1983 singles
Songs written by Marcus Miller
Songs written by Luther Vandross
Epic Records singles